Ron Faurot (born January 27, 1962 in Wichita, Kansas) is a former professional American football defensive lineman who played two seasons for the New York Jets in the National Football League.  He graduated from L.D. Bell High School, then was associated with University of Arkansas. Faurot currently owns and manages Broncos Sports Bar and Grill in Hurst, Texas.

References

1962 births
Living people
American football defensive ends
Arkansas Razorbacks football players
New York Jets players
Players of American football from Wichita, Kansas